Plumbuita may refer to:

 Plumbuita, a village in the Tămădău Mare Commune, Călărași County
 Plumbuita Monastery, in Colentina, Bucharest